Frank Sheahan may refer to:

 Frankie Sheahan (born 1976), Irish rugby union player
 Frank D. Sheahan (1901–1974), American politician

See also
Frank Sheehan (1933–2013), Canadian politician
Frank Sheehan (Australian politician) (1937–2021), Australian politician